is a major railway station in Shizuoka, Shizuoka Prefecture, Japan, operated by the Central Japan Railway Company (JR Central).

Lines
Shizuoka Station is served by the Tōkaidō Shinkansen and Tōkaidō Main Line, and is 180.2 rail km from Tokyo.

Station layout
Shizuoka Station has four platforms serving six tracks. Two island platforms with Tracks 1–4 serve the Tōkaidō Main Line trains, and long distance night trains. These platforms are connected with the station concourse via an underpass and are also connected at the same level to the Tōkaidō Shinkansen platforms. The Shinkansen station consists of two opposing side platforms serving two tracks, with two central tracks for non-stop trains. The station building has automated ticket machines, TOICA automated turnstiles, and a crewed "Green Window" service counter.

Platforms

Adjacent stations

History

Shizuoka station first opened on February 1, 1889, when the section of the Tōkaidō Main Line connecting Shizuoka with Kōzu was completed. A grand opening ceremony had been planned, but on this day a huge fire destroyed over 1,000 buildings in downtown Shizuoka. Railroad Minister Inoue Masaru cancelled his planned visit, and later the same day, the town around Gotemba Station, also in Shizuoka Prefecture, burned down. The initial Shizuoka Station building was rebuilt in 1907 and again in 1935. The Tōkaidō Shinkansen platforms were opened in 1964. In 1967, freight operations were relocated from Shizuoka Station to Higashi-Shizuoka Station (the present-day Shizuoka Freight Terminal). The station underwent a massive rebuilding program from the late 1970s, with the Tōkaidō Main Line tracks elevated in 1979 to the same level as the Tōkaidō Shinkansen tracks, and the Parche shopping centre/new station building completed in 1981. From 2006 to 2008, major renovations took place inside and around the station, including the underground walkways to and from the station, and the Asty shopping and dining complexes adjoined to the station.

Station numbering was introduced to the section of the Tōkaidō Line operated JR Central in March 2018; Shizuoka Station was assigned station number CA17.

References

 Yoshikawa, Fumio (2002). Tokaido-sen 130-nen no ayumi. Grand-Prix Publishing. .

External links

 Shizuoka Station information (JR Central) 

Railway stations in Shizuoka Prefecture
Railway stations in Japan opened in 1889
Railway stations in Shizuoka (city)